The Art Museum of Prykarpattia (originally called the Ivano-Frankivsk Regional Art Museum, until 2012) is a regional art museum that is located in the Church of Virgin Mary in Ivano-Frankivsk. It has one of the best collections of local religious art.

It is the only art museum in the region and specializes in displaying works by local artists.

The museum was established in 1980 and replaced the museum of geology of the city's Institute of Oil and Gas. It possesses a 15,000 item collection.

The most important exhibitions are the "Religious art of Galicia in the 15th-20th centuries" and baroque sculptures by Johann Georg Pinsel.

The museum has two branches:
 Memorial Museum of Vasyl Kasiyan in Sniatyn
 Museum-Monument of Architecture and Painting of the XVI and XVII Centuries, in the

Collection
At the end of the 2000s, the collection contained approximately 15,000 pieces, which include unique examples of Galician iconography and baroque sculpture, particularly six sculptures of Pinsel, and classical works of western Ukrainian painting by Kornylo Ustiyanovych, Ivan Trush, Yulian Pankevych, Yaroslav Pstrak, Oleksa Novakivskyi, Osip Sorokhtei, Olena Kulchytska, and others.

External links
  Hours of operation
  Quick overview
 Museum exposition
 Art Museum
 Ivano-Frankivsk Art Museum

Art museums and galleries in Ukraine
Museums in Ivano-Frankivsk Oblast
Art museums established in 1980